Elizabeth M. Williamson MRPharmS is a former Professor of Pharmacy at the University of Reading, England. Her main research interest is in herbal medicines.

She began work as a practising pharmacist in 1978, working in both community and hospital pharmacies. Before being appointed to the chair in the newly created School of Pharmacy at Reading in 2005 she was Senior Lecturer in Pharmacognosy and Phytotherapy at the University of London School of Pharmacy.

Her published works include an updated edition of the 1907 Potter's Herbal Cyclopaedia (1988, C W Daniel).

She is editor of the journal Phytotherapy Research.

References

Year of birth missing (living people)
Living people
Academics of the University of Reading
British pharmacists
Place of birth missing (living people)
Alumni of the UCL School of Pharmacy
20th-century women scientists
Women pharmacists